The ULMA Group is a business group made up of 9 cooperatives which operate in diverse sectors through its 9 strategic business units:  ULMA Greenhouses, ULMA Architectural Solutions, ULMA Maintenance Services, ULMA Conveyor Components, ULMA Embedded Solutions, ULMA Handling Systems, ULMA Construction, ULMA Packaging and ULMA Advanced Forged Solutions.
 
The group currently has a presence in 81 countries. With 60 years in the market, the group was part of the Industrial Division of the Mondragon Corporation
until 2022.

History

The origins of the ULMA Group date back to the early sixties and the creation of two separate cooperatives. The first was created in 1961 by six young mechanics following several meetings with José María Arizmendiarrieta, the local priest in Mondragón (Gipuzkoa) and the driving force behind what is today known as Mondragon. They decided to set up a cooperative called ULMA S.C.I. to provide ancillary services to the chocolate industry and later on entered the construction sector. At the same time and in the same region, four workers from the Forjas de Zubillaga (Zubillaga Forge) company decided to acquire a locksmith and accessories workshop. 
Both companies grew and established close ties during the late seventies and eighties and finally created the actual group in 1987 with the addition of Oinakar, a third cooperative that sold forklift trucks. The group was first named Oñalan and it's been called ULMA Group since 1989. 
In 1993, as a result of the decision to have its own cooperative group, ULMA decided not to take part in the organisational restructuring proposed by the Mondragon Cooperative Corporation (MCC). In 2002, however, its members approved the group joining the Industrial Division of Mondragon, of which it still forms a part.

In 2001, ULMA Packaging achieved the ISO 14,001 environmental certificate and in 2002 it also obtained the silver Q for Business Excellence.

In 2003, ULMA Forklift Trucks obtained the Company Registration Certificate accredited by AENOR for its "Assembly and Marketing of new Forklift Trucks" activity, which evidences the conformity of its Quality System with the UNE-EN 9001:2000 standard.

In 2005, ULMA Construcción received the Business Internationalization Award, a recognition granted by the Guipúzcoa Chamber of Commerce.

In 2008, ULMA Agrícola obtained ISO-9001/2008 for the design, manufacture and assembly of structures for protected crops.

In 2014, ULMA Piping's Design and Calculation of flanges were certified by ISO and API.

In 2022, the worker-owners of ULMA and Orona (elevators) voted to leave Mondragon Corporation.
As successful cooperatives, they had been contributing 10% of their profit to a solidarity fund helping ailing cooperatives.
They will try to define a more detached collaboration with the corporation.

Current situation
In 2015, 4,396 people worked for the Group, which recorded a turnover of EUR 716.4 million, of which around 80% was accounted for by international sales. Although all the cooperatives share general policies and management strategies, each one produces, rents, manufactures or markets its own products.
Since every cooperative has its own products, Ulma Group has all sort of projects in different countries, from Greenhouses in the Middle East desert (ULMA Agrícola) to Skyscrapers in  New York (ULMA Construction) or drainage channels in different buildings and stadiums around the world.

Social responsibility
Most of ULMA Group’s social responsibility is carried out through the ULMA Foundation. It was established in 2010 and supports projects with a social purpose which are financed with 10% of the group's profits.

References

External links 

 Official website

Conglomerate companies established in 1961
Construction and civil engineering companies of Spain
Basque companies
Spanish brands
Construction and civil engineering companies established in 1961
Spanish companies established in 1961
Mondragon Corporation